Moody Bible Institute (MBI) is a private evangelical Christian Bible college in Chicago, Illinois. It was founded by evangelist and businessman Dwight Lyman Moody in 1886. Historically, MBI has maintained positions that have identified it as non-charismatic, dispensational, and generally Calvinistic. Today, MBI operates undergraduate programs and Moody Theological Seminary at the Chicago campus. The Seminary also operates a satellite campus in Plymouth, Michigan. Moody Aviation operates a flight school in Spokane, Washington.

History

Early years 

Emma Dryer organized the "May Institute", a weekly meeting for prayer and fellowship, with Moody's permission in 1883. Participants in the May Institute encouraged Moody to found a school to train young people for evangelism to carry on the Christian revival tradition.

On January 22, 1886, Moody addressed church members: "I tell you what, and what I have on my heart, I believe we have got to have gap-men: men to stand between the laity and the ministers; men who are trained to do city mission work. Take men that have the gifts and train them for the work of reaching the people." As a result of this meeting, held at Farwell Hall, the group founded the Chicago Evangelization Society for the "education and training of Christian workers, including teachers, ministers, missionaries, and musicians who may completely and effectively proclaim the gospel of Jesus Christ." The society was renamed "Moody Bible Institute" after Moody died in 1899.

Before 1900, Moody played a significant role in fund-raising to support MBI. After Moody died, however, the institute struggled financially. James M. Gray, the president of the school, invited Henry Parsons Crowell to financially restructure the institute. Crowell established the school on business principles of productivity and performance. The MBI Executive Committee met nearly every Tuesday for the next 40 years. An administration building took years to complete, but when the building was dedicated there was no mortgage and only $50,000 left to pay.

21st century 

Since 2012, MBI has received federal financial assistance, which means the religious institution is subject to federal rules, including Title IX, which prohibits sex-based discrimination. After several female students complained of being denied access to the then-male-only pastoral ministry program, the institute changed its policy in 2016. However, professor Janay Garrick, who helped the students file Title IX complaints, found that her employment contract would not be renewed at the end of 2017. MBI engaged Grand River Solutions to review its Title IX compliance and make recommendations for change.

In November 2017, the institution announced the closure of its campus in Spokane, Washington, and reductions in other programs and services in response to continued drops in enrollment. Faculty were distressed by impending job losses, and penned an anonymous letter to the administration in the student newspaper expressing concerns about faculty layoffs when the administration had just committed $22 million for a new campus building. Two months later the president and Chief Operating Officer both resigned and the provost retired. In its announcement of these changes, the institution cited "widespread concerns over the direction" of the institution. 

Mark Jobe, founder of the multisite New Life Community Church, became the new president in January 2019. In July 2019, Jobe announced a long-range plan to redevelop portions of Moody's campus. Proceeds from the sale of 8.1 acres would be earmarked for campus improvements, scholarships, endowment, and financial reserves. The "North Union" project was approved by Chicago Plan Commission in July 2021 and by Chicago City Council in October 2022.

Academics 

MBI's stated mission is to train students for full-time ministry in churches and parachurch organizations. Since 1989 it has been accredited by the Higher Learning Commission or its predecessor. It is also accredited by the Association for Biblical Higher Education and the National Association of Schools of Music.

Undergraduate 

In addition to a Bachelor of Arts degree, which is available in over two dozen fields including theology, the Bible, and ministries of various emphases, MBI offers a Bachelor of Science degree in Biblical Studies, a Bachelor of Science degree in Missionary Aviation Technology, a two-year Associates of Biblical Studies degree (ABS), and a five-year Bachelor of Music degree (BMus) in Sacred Music. Furthermore, non-degree TESOL and Biblical Studies one-year certificates are offered.

Graduate 

The Moody Theological Seminary offers a Master of Divinity, Master of Arts in Biblical Studies, and a Master of Counseling/Psychology. A one-year graduate certificate is also offered.

In November 2009, Moody Bible Institute and Michigan Theological Seminary jointly announced plans for Michigan Theological Seminary to merge with Moody Bible Institute's Moody Theological Seminary and Graduate School. In January 2010, Michigan Theological Seminary became Moody Theological Seminary–Michigan located in Plymouth, Michigan.

Media ministries 

In addition to its educational programs, Moody runs two Christian media ministries: Moody Radio and Moody Publishers. 
In 1894, Moody Publishers was founded under the name Bible Institute Colportage Association. In 1926 the Institute expanded its reach beyond education and publishing by sponsoring the first non-commercial Christian radio station in America, WMBI. Over time, MBI's radio outreach grew to the Moody Broadcasting Network, which now owns and operates 36 commercial-free stations and provides programming via satellite to more than 700 outlets.

The former Moody magazine ceased publication in 2003.

See also 

 List of Moody Bible Institute people

References

Further reading 

 Gloege, Timothy E. W. Guaranteed Pure: The Moody Bible Institute, Business, and the Making of Modern Evangelicalism. (Chapel Hill, North Carolina: University of North Carolina Press, 2015).

External links 

Official website

Moody Bible Institute
Evangelical seminaries and theological colleges
Association for Biblical Higher Education
Nondenominational Christian universities and colleges in the United States
Universities and colleges in Chicago
Bible colleges
Educational institutions established in 1886
Seminaries and theological colleges in Illinois
1886 establishments in Illinois